Panton is a village in the civil parish of East Barkwith, in the East Lindsey of district, Lincolnshire, England. It is in the civil parish of East Barkwith.

Panton is listed in the 1086 Domesday Book with 32 households,  of meadow and a church.

The former St Andrews church, built in the 18th century, is Grade II listed. It was restored in 1905, when the chancel arch was built, and again 1925-30 by Christopher Turnor. Several 18th-century gravestones survive. The church is now a dwelling.

References

External links

Villages in Lincolnshire
East Lindsey District